Jean-Christophe Simond (born 29 April 1960 in Les Contamines-Montjoie) is a French figure skater and coach. He is a two-time European silver medalist and an eight-time French national champion. During his competitive career, he was well known for his excellent school figures. He coached 2007 World Champion Brian Joubert between 2006 and March 2009.

Competitive highlights

References

 
 

French male single skaters
Olympic figure skaters of France
Figure skaters at the 1976 Winter Olympics
Figure skaters at the 1980 Winter Olympics
Figure skaters at the 1984 Winter Olympics
French figure skating coaches
1960 births
Living people
Sportspeople from Haute-Savoie
European Figure Skating Championships medalists